Akarsu is a village in the Beytüşşebap District of Şırnak Province in Turkey. The village is populated by Kurds of the Gewdan tribe and had a population of 98 in 2021.

The six hamlets of Düzkavak, Gölgeli, İkili, Ovacık, Yamaçaltı and Yandere are attached to Akarsu.

References 

Villages in Beytüşşebap District
Kurdish settlements in Şırnak Province